The Dedhrota is a village and a former Princely state in Gujarat, India.

History 
Dedhrota was a sixth class princely state in the Sabar Kantha Thana in Mahi Kantha Agency and ruled by Koli chieftains. It have two more villages and a population of 725 souls. Its annual revenue was 2,203 and tributary to the Baroda State. It was covering an area of 10 square miles. It was a Jurisdictional state.

Rulers 
The rulers of Dedhrota bore the title of Thakur or Thakore.

 Thakore Shri Punjsinh (b. 1850)
 Thakore Shri Nathusinh Punjsinh
 Thakore Shri Daulatsinh Nathusinh (b. 1895, succeeded 1913)
 Thakore Shri Pratapsinh Daulatsinh (b. 1916, succeeded 1921, invested with power 1936)
 Thakore Shri Kishorsinh Daulatsinh (b. 1920)

References